Season Seven of Big Brother Germany lasted for 148 days from 5 February 2007 to 7 July 2007 and was shown on RTL Zwei.

Summary
After a disappointing sixth season, which was supposed to run forever but was cut short and a year break the producers decided to return with a "Back to the roots"-format for season seven with 12 housemates living together in one house and the only twist being that the housemates had to earn the prize. For every match, a certain amount of money was put in the jackpot with the maximum being €250,000 which only the winner would receive.
During the season the nomination rules were changed several times (see notes in the nominations table) for entertainment purposes and to protect controversial housemates. The most controversial of them was Eddy, who was disliked by a large number of viewers but also had a strong fanbase. Within the house, he had friends (e.g. Basti and Oliver) and "enemies" (e.g. Leon and Janine), with alliances changing over the season (he was friends with Kathrin and Michael at first, but fell out with them later). After being evicted by his fellow housemates Eddy returned as a guest in the final week and provoked some of the most controversial moments of the season (with his targets being Kathrin and Michael). These moments probably helped Michael to win the show, as he was considered a victim of Eddy's provocations. Additionally, Michael's strongest rival for the win, Sonja, had become Basti's girlfriend during the season and Basti was close with Eddy (Basti re-entered as a guest in the final week together with Eddy).
Despite not being a rating hit, season 7 at least lived up to RTL II's low expectations and an 8th Season was greenlit right at the end of the show.

Housemates

Nominations table

Notes 

: As the Golden Housemate of the Week, Oliver had the option to nominate a third person that would automatically up for eviction. He chose to take this offer and nominated Leon.
: As new Housemate, Sinan had to nominate one person that would be automatically up for eviction. He chose Sheila. Anna, Basti and Eddy were banned from nominating as punishment for discussing nominations.
: As a new Housemate, Natasha was immune from getting nominated. Sheila was automatically nominated after losing a football competition. Jeannine was automatically nominated for having after achieving the last place in a karaoke competition. Eddy received a nominations point from the viewers.
: For constant rule-breaking by the household Big Brother decided to organize a snap eviction with the person who received the most votes immediately evicted. As new housemates, Doreen and Knubbel were immuned from eviction.
: Nominations were voluntary, so only two Housemates nominated this week. However, as the Golden Housemate of the Week, Basti had to nominate a second person that would face the public vote. He chose Oliver.
: As a new Housemate, Janine was exempt from nominations. Nominations were done in Eurovision Style, where every Housemate had to give 9 nomination points to their favourite Housemate, 8 for their second favourite all the way down to 1 point for their least favourite. The bottom three were nominated for eviction.
: As the Golden Housemate of the Week, Eddy was immune from being nominated. Next to this, all female Housemates could nominate but could not be nominated. Nominations were done face-to-face. As there was a tie for the third nomination place Eddy, as the Golden Housemate, had to choose the third nominee from either Basti or Oliver, who both received one nomination point. He chose Oliver.
: As he came last in the marathon match, Knubbel was automatically nominated. This week's nominations were made by the housemates' mothers (and Knubbels sister). After the Housemates refused to complete their weekly task Big Brother decided that an extra Housemate should be up for eviction three days after the voting started. The Housemates each had to nominate someone for eviction. Eddy and Knubbel could not be nominated as they are already up for eviction. Doreen received the most nominations with 3 and was up for eviction with Eddy and Knubbel.
: The audience voted for Eddy as being immune from getting nominated.
: This week's nominations were made by the public. The housemate then had to decide whom of the top 3 vote-getters would be evicted.

See also
Main Article about the show

External links
Official Homepage
Housemate pictures, Nominations and Evictions
All profiles if the housemates season 8 (German)

2007 German television seasons
07